Fazl ibn Musa ibn Ja'far is the tomb and shrine attributed to one of the sons of Musa al-Kadhim. It is in Jahrom. The shrine is a small simple building with no decorations or tiling inside. The shrine has a simple brick dome. Monuments of the shrine in 806 AH on the orders of King Muhammad Seljuk.

The monument has long attracted the attention of the people of Jahrom County and surrounding cities.

References

Mosques in Jahrom
Buildings and structures in Jahrom